Almir Izmailovich Kayumov (30 December 1964 – 7 August 2013) was a Russian football player and referee.

Career 
Kayumov played for FC Neftekhimik Nizhnekamsk, FC Lada Togliatti, Spartak Moscow, Rotor Volgograd, SKA Rostov-on-Don, in Russia, the Daewoo Royals in South Korea, and Kuopion Palloseura in Finland. He played 6 games in the UEFA Cup 1986–87 for FC Spartak Moscow.

On November 9, 2009, it was reported that Kayumov attempted to commit suicide by jumping out of his apartment window. Police negotiators talked him down, however, and he was brought to a psychiatric hospital. Kayumov later denied this, stating that he had just an ordinary treatment.

Death 

Kayumov died on 7 August 2013, when he was hit by a GAZelle truck in Smolensk. According to investigators, his death was a suicide as the surveillance camera footage showed that he jumped in front of the truck.

Honours
 Soviet Top League champion: 1987.
 Soviet Top League runner-up: 1984, 1985.
 Soviet Top League bronze: 1986.
 Soviet Cup winner: 1992.

References

External links
 
 

1964 births
2013 deaths
Association football defenders
Russian footballers
Russian football referees
Soviet Top League players
FC Spartak Moscow players
FC SKA Rostov-on-Don players
FC Rotor Volgograd players
Busan IPark players
FC Lada-Tolyatti players
FC Tyumen players
FC Neftekhimik Nizhnekamsk players
Russian Premier League players
K League 1 players
Veikkausliiga players
Russian expatriate footballers
Russian expatriate sportspeople in Finland
Russian expatriate sportspeople in South Korea
Expatriate footballers in Finland
Expatriate footballers in South Korea
Suicides in Russia
Road incident deaths in Russia
Tatar people of Russia
Tatar sportspeople
Filmed suicides